Fulton County is a county in the Commonwealth of Pennsylvania. As of the 2020 census, the population was 14,556, making it the fourth-least populous county in Pennsylvania. Its county seat is McConnellsburg. The county was created on April 19, 1850, from part of Bedford County and named for inventor Robert Fulton.

Geography
It is in the watershed of the Chesapeake Bay and, although most of the county is drained by the Potomac River, some northern and northeastern areas are drained by the Juniata River into the Susquehanna River. It has a humid continental climate (Dfa/Dfb) and average monthly temperatures in McConnellsburg range from 29.2 °F in January to 73.0 °F in July.

Adjacent counties
Huntingdon County (north)
Franklin County (east)
Washington County, Maryland (south)
Allegany County, Maryland (southwest)
Bedford County (west)

Geology
Fulton County is situated within the Ridge and Valley physiographic province, which is characterized by folded and faulted sedimentary rocks of early to middle Paleozoic age.

The stratigraphic record of sedimentary rocks within the county spans from the Cambrian Shadygrove Formation outcropping just south of McConnelsburg to the Pennsylvanian Allegheny Group at the northernmost tip of the county.  No igneous or metamorphic rocks of any kind exist within Fulton county.

Mountain ridges within Fulton County include Rays Hill (along the western border with Bedford County), Town Hill, Sideling Hill, Scrub Ridge, and Meadow Grounds Mountain, and all these are held up by the Mississippian Pocono Formation, made of quartz sandstone and conglomerate.  Rays Hill and Town Hill form a syncline, as do Scrub Ridge and Meadow Grounds Mountain, and Sideling Hill itself is a syncline.  Dickeys Mountain and Tuscarora Mountain (along the eastern border with Franklin County) also form a syncline, but these ridges are held up by the Tuscarora Formation.  Broad Top, located in the northeast corner of the county, is a plateau of relatively flat-lying rocks that are stratigraphically higher, and thus younger (Mississippian and Pennsylvanian), than most of the other rocks within the county.  Broad Top extends into Huntingdon County to the north and Bedford County to the west.

All of Fulton County lies far to the south of the glacial boundary, and thus it was never glaciated.  However, during the Pleistocene epoch, or "Ice Age," periglacial (meaning "around glacier" or simply "cold") processes dominated.  Most of the county was most likely a tundra during the Pleistocene.

The Broad Top Coal Field is located in Wells Township in the northwestern corner of the county. The field contains bituminous coal.  There are a few abandoned mines in the area, although acid mine drainage is not as much of an environmental problem in Fulton County as it is in adjacent Bedford and Huntingdon Counties.

Interesting geologic features within Fulton County include some of the following:
 The Meadow Grounds syncline west of McConnellsburg.
 A transpression structure is located on the east side of the Meadow Grounds syncline.  This structure consists of a complex set of up-thrust fault blocks of Silurian and Devonian rocks bounded on all sides by north-trending faults.

Demographics

As of the census of 2000, there were 14,261 people, 5,660 households, and 4,097 families residing in the county.  The population density was 33 people per square mile (13/km2).  There were 6,790 housing units at an average density of 16 per square mile (6/km2).  The racial makeup of the county was 98.25% White, 0.66% Black or African American, 0.20% Native American, 0.11% Asian, 0.01% Pacific Islander, 0.04% from other races, and 0.72% from two or more races.  0.36% of the population were Hispanic or Latino of any race. 40.8% were of German, 20.4% American, 8.3% Irish and 6.9% English ancestry.

There were 5,660 households, out of which 31.70% had children under the age of 18 living with them, 59.50% were married couples living together, 8.20% had a female householder with no husband present, and 27.60% were non-families. 24.00% of all households were made up of individuals, and 10.60% had someone living alone who was 65 years of age or older.  The average household size was 2.50 and the average family size was 2.95.

In the county, the population was spread out, with 24.60% under the age of 18, 7.60% from 18 to 24, 28.40% from 25 to 44, 25.00% from 45 to 64, and 14.50% who were 65 years of age or older.  The median age was 38 years. For every 100 females there were 100.10 males.  For every 100 females age 18 and over, there were 98.60 males.

Almost everyone who lives in Fulton County speaks English as their first language. The dominant form of speech in Fulton County is the Central Pennsylvania accent.

2020 Census

Politics

|}

Fulton County has displayed strong tendencies to vote for Republican candidates in past elections. In the 2004 United States presidential election, George W. Bush carried the county by a massive 52.6% margin over John Kerry, making it Bush's strongest county in the slightly Democratic state, which Kerry won by a 2.5% margin over Bush. Furthermore, in 2008, John McCain carried Fulton by a 48.6% margin over Barack Obama, McCain's best showing in the Keystone State, which Obama won by a 10.3% margin over McCain. The county voted for Donald Trump in 2016 by a 70.8% margin, the highest in the state. The county has voted for the Republican in every presidential election since 1964. In 2006, Rick Santorum and Lynn Swann received more than 60% of the Fulton County vote despite their defeats statewide. In the 2012 election, Fulton County was the only county in Pennsylvania where Barack Obama won less than 25% of the white vote.

Law and government

State Senate
 Judy Ward, Republican, Pennsylvania's 30th Senatorial District

State House of Representatives
 Jesse Topper, Republican, Pennsylvania's 63rd Representative District

United States House of Representatives
 John Joyce, Republican, Pennsylvania's 13th congressional district

United States Senate
 John Fetterman, Democrat
 Bob Casey Jr., Democrat

Education

Public school districts
 Central Fulton School District
 Forbes Road School District
 Southern Fulton School District

Transportation

Major Highways
 - known as the Buchanan Trail, meets its western terminus in McConnellsburg; serves as a major two-lane through route across South-Central Pennsylvania, as it travels toward Waynesboro in Franklin County
 - this long Central Pennsylvania main street sees is final two miles run through the rural corner of Union Township, as it departs a long Bedford County stretch, before reaching the Maryland border
 - a winding portion of the famous Lincoln Highway, the highway travels away from I-76, which it parallels through most of the state's central mountains, to run across the county between the truck stop-lined Breezewood (East Providence Township) in Bedford County toward Franklin County's Chambersburg; although two-lane for its entire route, there is a limited access segment as the highway makes a short freeway bypass around McConnellsburg. the road serves as one of the county's two major arteries, largely oriented east/west, with its bypass intersecting US-522 just north of McConnellsburg. 
 - just prior to entering the county, the route breaks from its consignment with I-76, and it travels due south through a rural swath of the western portion of the county, as it connects with I-68 just across the Maryland line, along its way to Baltimore
 - a portion of the Pennsylvania Turnpike, this toll interstate has one exit as it crosses the northern portion of the county; the Sideling Hill travel center is located Taylor Township
 - a relatively short and highly rural range highway, it meets its southern terminus in Dublin Township, as it travels north through sparsely populated portions of Huntingdon County
 - this short highway runs entirely within the county, serving the purpose of connecting I-70 with PA 26, as it runs across Union and Bethel Townships
 - this routes enters from Maryland to the south as part of a brief consignment with I-70, which it departs three miles into the county; the road serves as one of the county's two major arteries, largely oriented north–south,  as it runs through McConnellsburg, past the county's only shopping center and through one of its only two stoplights, on its way to a junction with the Pennsylvania Turnpike in Dublin Township and toward Huntingdon County. it intersects with the US 30 bypass just north of McConnellsburg. 
 - just seven miles in length, this very short access route connects I-70 with the hills of Bethel and Brush Creek Townships
 - this highway serves as a long, rural ridge route through the state's central mountains; its southern terminus is with the Maryland boundary in Thompson Township and it exits the county via Taylor Township toward Huntingdon County in the north
 - one of the shortest numbered routes in Pennsylvania, this five mile road connects I-70 with Route 484, as it runs entirely through Union Township
 - a very rural access route through Bedford and Huntingdon Counties, this road's final miles are in Wells and Taylor Township
 - a mountain ridge cut-off-road, this highway travels from rural Bedford County along a valley setting toward its terminus with I-70 in Brush Creek Township
 - a rural bi-state connector, this road travels from Ayr Township to the Maryland border via Thompson Township

Other
Fulton County is one of only two counties in Pennsylvania with no known active railroad lines of any kind, the other being Sullivan County.

Communities

Under Pennsylvania law, there are four types of incorporated municipalities: cities, boroughs, townships, and, in at most two cases, towns. The following boroughs and townships are located in Fulton County:

Boroughs
McConnellsburg (county seat)
Valley-Hi

Townships

 Ayr Township
 Belfast Township
 Bethel Township
 Brush Creek Township
 Dublin Township
 Licking Creek Township
 Taylor Township
 Thompson Township
 Todd Township
 Union Township
 Wells Township

Unincorporated Communities

 Amaranth
 Big Cove Tannery
 Burnt Cabins
 Crystal Spring
 Dott
 Fort Littleton
 Harrisonville
 Hustontown
 Warfordsburg
 Waterfall
 Wells Tannery
 Wood

Population ranking
The population ranking of the following table is based on the 2010 census of Fulton County.

† county seat

Census-designated places
Needmore

See also
 National Register of Historic Places listings in Fulton County, Pennsylvania

References

External links
 Fulton County Historical Society, Inc.
 Fulton County Chamber of Commerce and Tourism
 Fulton Industrial Development Association

 
1850 establishments in Pennsylvania
Populated places established in 1850
Counties of Appalachia